This is a list of Mexican television related events from 2011.

Events
18 December - Óscar Cruz wins the first season of La Voz... México.

Debuts

11 September - La Voz... México (2011–present)

Television shows

1970s
Plaza Sésamo (1972–present)

Ending this year

Births

Deaths

See also
List of Mexican films of 2011
2011 in Mexico